Dargah Committee Dargah Khwaja Saheb, Ajmer, is a statutory body constituted by the Ministry of Minority Affairs, Government of India, under the provisions of Section 5 of the Dargah Khwaja Saheb Act, 1955 for the administration of Dargah Sharif, Ajmer.

Creation 
	
The Dargah Khwaja Saheb Act, 1955 was passed by the Parliament of India in 1955. That act provided for the creation of the Dargah Committee as a statutory body to manage Dargah Sharif in Ajmer. The Dargah Committee is appointed by the Government and manages donations, takes care of the maintenance of the shrine, and runs charitable institutions like dispensaries, and guest houses for the devotees.

Functions 
 To administer, control and manage Dargah Endowment.
 Arrangements of the Urs of Khwaja Saheb and his Peer-o-Murseed Khwaja Usman Harooni every year.
 Providing free langar twice a day.
 To receive money and other income of Dargah Endowment and spent in sound manner.
 To determine the privileges of the Khadims and to regulate their presence in the Dargah by the grant of them licenses in that behalf, if the Committee thinks it necessary.
 Arrangements of Unani and Homeopathic dispensaries and supply of free medicine.
 Maintenance of Khwaja Model School and Darul Uloom Moinia Usmaniya.

See also 
 Ajmer Sharif Dargah
 Khwaja Gareeb Nawaz

References

External links 
Dargah Khwaja Saheb Act, 1955
Dargah Committee Official Website

Government of India
Organizations established in 1955
1955 establishments in India